The UEFA–CONMEBOL memorandum of understanding is an agreement between UEFA and CONMEBOL, the association football confederations of Europe and South America, respectively, signed between both parties with the aim of achieving close collaboration for the development of this sport in the regions. It was signed on 12 February 2020 and extended on 15 December 2021 in a first stage, and on 2 June 2022 in a second stage. This will permit creation of official championships in the branches of men's, women's, youth and indoor football and the possibility of exchanging referees in the tournaments organized by both entities.

In January 2022, CONMEBOL and UEFA authorities met at the CONMEBOL headquarters in Asunción, Paraguay, and ratified the agreements they had already signed for future competitions, such as the participation of South American teams in the 2024–25 UEFA Nations League. Both parts also agreed to establish a joint office in London.

Mission and objectives
The MoU seeks to provide assistance and support between both confederations to establish and implement projects and activities related to:

 the promotion and development of grassroots football, youth football and women's football
 the organization of championships
 marketing, legal and social responsibility matters
 security;
 the promotion of ethical principles and good governance in football

Committees
In order to move forward with the projects, 4 joint committees were created through the memorandum. The strategies of both confederations in the different committees are coordinated in a Joint Representation Office located in London, England, United Kingdom, inaugurated on 4 April 2022.

The committees are:

Refereeing
As of the signing of the MoU, a referee exchange program was started, allowing referees and assistant referees appointed by their respective confederation to participate in matches in competitions organized by the other signatory party.​ Below is the list of referees appointed within the exchange program:

Women's football

The agreement provides a development strategy for this branch in all its member associations, as well as the creation of different competitions. The first women's football championship planned from the MoU is the UEFA-CONMEBOL Women's Finalissima, a tournament that emulates the CONMEBOL–UEFA Cup of Champions in the women's branch.

Development and coaches

The purpose of this committee is to provide a joint project for the creation of:

 Elite young player development programs
 Scout Development
 Joint coaching licences: A mutual recognition of titles and coaching licenses (for example, equivalence between UEFA Pro License and CONMEBOL PRO License) is planned for 2023.

Competitions
The competitions created under the memorandum are the following ones:

 CONMEBOL–UEFA Cup of Champions: a quadrennial match featuring men's football champions of the UEFA Euro and the CONMEBOL Copa América. There were two editions prior to the signing of the MoU (1985 and 1993). Its relaunch was made official on 28 September 2021, agreeing to organize three new editions. The first of them was held on 1 June 2022 at Wembley Stadium, under the name of Finalissima.
 Under-20 Intercontinental Cup: a biennial match featuring men's football champions of the UEFA Youth League and the U-20 Copa Libertadores. Its first edition was held on 21 August 2022 at the Centenario Stadium in Montevideo.
 Futsal Finalissima: a quadrennial match featuring men's futsal champions and runners-up of the UEFA Futsal Championship and the Copa América de Futsal. The first edition was held from 15 to 18 September 2022 at the Movistar Arena Stadium in Buenos Aires.
 UEFA–CONMEBOL Women's Finalissima: a quadrennial match featuring women's football champions of the UEFA Women's Euro and the Women's Conmebol Copa América. The first edition is scheduled to be play on FIFA Women's International Matchweek of February 2023 in Europe.

References

2020 in association football
UEFA
CONMEBOL